The Corbeddu cave is located in the territory of Oliena, municipality of the province of Nuoro, in Sardinia. In this cave found refuge the famous Sardinian bandit Giovanni Corbeddu Salis (1844-1898), from which it took its name.

The cave is about 130 meters long and consists essentially of three "rooms". Inside, important archaeological finds have been made, in particular some human remains, a Phalanx bone, dated to around 20,000 years ago, which constitute the oldest evidence of Homo sapiens in Sardinia. Other findings of human bones, always referable to the final phase of the Paleolithic, include a jaw bone and a temporal bone.

In addition, bone and stone tools were discovered that were used by these prehistoric people in their daily lives. The cave, as evidenced by further findings, was also inhabited during the Neolithic period. In addition to the human bones in the cave there were numerous bones of extinct animals such as the Praemegaceros cazioti and Prolagus sardus.

References

External links

Caves of Italy
Province of Nuoro